Gold: Their Great Hits is a greatest hits album released by the Canadian-American hard rock band Steppenwolf. The album, released in 1971, charted at #24 on the Billboard Pop Albums charts and was certified "gold" by the RIAA on April 12, 1971. Initial pressings of the album came in a gatefold sleeve, with a detachable poster of the band.

Reception

In a retrospective review, Allmusic praised the production and engineering of most of the tracks and called it a "nearly perfect" introduction to the band.

Record track listing 
Side one
"Born to Be Wild" (Mars Bonfire) – 3:28
"It's Never Too Late" (Kay, Nick St. Nicholas) – 4:05
"Rock Me" (Dave Grusin, Kay) – 3:39
"Hey Lawdy Mama" (Larry Byrom, Jerry Edmonton, Kay) – 3:00
"Move Over" (Kay, Gabriel Mekler) – 2:53
"Who Needs Ya" (Byrom, Kay) – 2:59

Side two
"Magic Carpet Ride" (John Kay, Rushton Moreve) – 4:30
"The Pusher" (Hoyt Axton, Kay) – 5:43
"Sookie, Sookie" (Don Covay, Steve Cropper) – 3:09
"Jupiter's Child" (Edmonton, Kay, Monarch) – 3:24
"Screaming Night Hog" (Kay) – 3:17

CD track listing 
"Magic Carpet Ride" (John Kay, Rushton Moreve) – 4:30
"The Pusher" (Hoyt Axton, Kay) – 5:43
"Born to Be Wild" (Mars Bonfire) – 3:28
"Sookie, Sookie" (Don Covay, Steve Cropper) – 3:09
"It's Never Too Late" (Kay, Nick St. Nicholas) – 4:05
"Rock Me" (Dave Grusin, Kay) – 3:39
"Hey Lawdy Mama" (Larry Byrom, Jerry Edmonton, Kay) – 3:00
"Move Over" (Kay, Gabriel Mekler) – 2:53
"Who Needs Ya?" (Byrom, Kay) – 2:59
"Jupiter's Child" (Edmonton, Kay, Monarch) – 3:24
"Screaming Night Hog" (Kay) – 3:17

Song information
"Hey Lawdy Mama"
A single released in 1970, it became a top 40 hit, reaching number 18 in Canada, and peaking at 35 on The Billboard Hot 100. The tune was covered by punk rock group, The Minutemen, for their Project: Mersh EP.

"Screaming Night Hog"
Also released in 1970, it reached number 50 in Canada.

Personnel 
 John Kay – vocals, guitar, talk box, harmonica
 Michael Monarch – guitar
 Larry Byrom – guitar
 Nick St. Nicholas – bass guitar
 George Biondo – bass guitar, backing vocals
 Rushton Moreve – bass guitar
 Goldy McJohn – Hammond organ, piano
 Jerry Edmonton – drums

Charts

References

  	

1971 greatest hits albums
Steppenwolf (band) compilation albums
Dunhill Records compilation albums